The 2018 Tournament of Nations was the second Tournament of Nations, an international women's football tournament, consisting of a series of friendly games. It was held in the United States, from July 26 to August 2, 2018, and featured the same four teams as the previous tournament.

Format
The tournament featured the national teams of Australia, Brazil, Japan, and the hosts, the United States, competing in a round-robin format, with each team playing every other once. Three points were awarded for a win, one for a draw, and none for a loss.

Venues
Three cities served as the venues for the tournament.

Squads

Standings

All times are local (CDT in Kansas City and Bridgeview, EDT in East Hartford).

Matches

Goalscorers

Television coverage
All three USA games were televised domestically on FS1.

In Australia, all three games featuring the national team were televised live on Fox Sports.

In Brazil, all three games featuring the national team were televised live on SporTV and online at the CBF website.

References

Tournament of Nations
2018 Tournament of Nations
2018 in American women's soccer
2018 in women's association football
July 2018 sports events in the United States
August 2018 sports events in the United States
Soccer in Connecticut
Soccer in Illinois
Soccer in Kansas